Morgenthaler is one of the oldest private equity investment firms in the US investing through both venture capital and leverage buyout transactions.  Morgenthaler operates two connected private equity businesses:
 Morgenthaler Ventures – venture capital business focused on life sciences and information technology investments
 Morgenthaler Partners – buyout business focused on management buyouts, leveraged recapitalizations and leveraged rollups.

The firm which was founded by David Morgenthaler in 1968, is based in Cleveland with offices in Menlo Park, California, Boston, and Boulder, Colorado.

History
David Morgenthaler founded the firm in 1968 after a career as an operating executive.  From 1957 until 1968, Morgenthaler was CEO of Foseco, Inc., a manufacturer of specialty chemicals owned by early venture capital firm J.H. Whitney & Co. After selling his venture-backed business to an international company, Morgenthaler decided to pursue venture capital investing on his own.

David Morgenthaler
In addition to his role in building a nationally focused venture capital firm, Morgenthaler also took a leadership role in establishing the legitimacy and potential of the nascent venture capital industry.

He served from 1977 to 1979 as the President and then Chairman of the National Venture Capital Association (NVCA).

During Morgenthaler's tenure at NVCA, he was called to testify before Congress in support of the capital gains tax reduction enacted in 1978.  He was also involved in changing the ERISA legislation in 1979, allowing for pension funds to invest in private equity for the first time. ''(See also: Early history of private equity: Regulatory and tax changes)

Morgenthaler was awarded the first National Venture Capital Lifetime Achievement Award in 1998 for his role in the emergence of the venture capital industry.  Morgenthaler was inducted into the Private Equity Analyst's Venture Capital Hall of Fame.

Earlier in his career, Morgenthaler was a member of the management team of several young growth companies.  He received both a BS and a MS degree in mechanical engineering from the Massachusetts Institute of Technology in 1941.

Morgenthaler died in June 2016, at the age of 96. He worked up until the very end, with his son noting that he was testing an app from his hospital bed. "At age 96, almost 97, who does that?" his son said.

Investment funds
Since the 1980s, when Morgenthaler began raising private equity funds from institutional investors in the early 1980s, the firm has raised over $2.8 billion of investor commitments.

 1985 - Morgenthaler Venture Partners II - $ 30m
 1989 - Morgenthaler Venture Partners III - $ 65m
 1995 - Morgenthaler Venture Partners IV - $ 135m
 1998 - Morgenthaler Venture Partners V - $ 300m
 2000 - Morgenthaler Venture Partners VI - $ 575m
 2001 - Morgenthaler Venture Partners VII - $ 850m
 2005 - Morgenthaler Venture Partners VIII - $ 450m
 2008 - Morgenthaler Ventures IX - $ 400m+

Historically, Morgenthaler funds have made both venture capital and leveraged buyout investments out of the same fund. In November 2008, Morgenthaler Ventures exceeded its fundraising goal and closed its ninth fund (Morgenthaler Venture Partners IX) at slightly more than $400 million. MVP IX is the first Morgenthaler fund to focus solely on venture capital investments. By comparison, Morgenthaler Ventures was allocated approximately $315 million to invest in the previous fund.

In August 2013, General Partners Gary Little, Rebecca Lynn, and Gary Morgenthaler formed a new and separate firm called Canvas Venture Fund with an inaugural $175M early-stage IT-only fund. These three general partners continue to serve on the boards of their Morgenthaler portfolio companies, including Lending Club (the fourth largest Internet IPO since 2001 behind Facebook, Twitter and Google), MuleSoft, Evernote, Doximity, etc. They were later joined by Paul Hsiao, a 10-year partner at NEA, in May 2014. Canvas was named the No.1 "VC Firm to Watch" by Forbes on its 2015 Midas List.

References

Further reading

 David Morgenthaler, March 23, 2006
 Venture Firms Worried Caution flags raised at annual conference, 1996
Smart Leaders: DAVID MORGENTHALER
Morgenthaler closes seventh fund on $850m, August 2001.
Morgenthaler Ventures Wraps Up 2006 With 3 IPOs and 2 Mega M&A Events
Navigating Sand Hill Road, 2006
Investors turn away from Ohio as heavy use of tax dollars to woo jobs doesn't pay off.  The Toledo Blade, 2006
Morgenthaler Ventures Profile (The Funded)

Why APIs Will Save Your Business From Getting Uber-ed
MuleSoft Postpones IPO for More Funding at $1.5 Billion Valuation

External links
Morgenthaler (company website)

Private equity firms of the United States
Venture capital firms of the United States
Financial services companies established in 1968
Companies based in Cleveland
1968 establishments in Ohio